William Wallace Furst (March 25, 1852 – July 11, 1917) was an American composer of musical theatre pieces and a music director, best remembered for supplying incidental music to theatrical productions on Broadway.

Biography 
Furst was born in Baltimore, Maryland. He studied music in Baltimore, and was a church organist at the age of 14.

Career 
Furst's comic opera Electric Light was produced and conducted by him in 1878, and for the five seasons following he received engagements as conductor of opera. By the 1880s, he was composing theatrical music for productions starring Herbert Beerbohm Tree, Maude Adams, Otis Skinner, William Faversham, Viola Allen and Mrs. Leslie Carter.  He composed the music for five Shakespeare productions by Margaret Anglin at the Berkeley Stadium in California, as well as her production of Electra.  One of his earliest operettas was My Geraldine (1880).

In the late 1880s and early 1890s, Furst was the orchestra director at the Tivoli Theatre in
San Francisco, California.  He composed his only opera, Theodora, for the Tivoli.  In 1892, he composed the successful operetta The Isle of Champagne.  In 1893, he published "The Girl I Left Behind Me" and moved to New York City, becoming the music director at the now-demolished Empire Theater.  The same year, he composed the music (along with Charles Alfred Byrne and Louis Harrison) for the musical Miss Nicotine with Lillian Russell and Marie Dressler Another such Empire piece was The Little Trooper, starring Della Fox (1894) followed by The Little Minister (1897).  In 1898, he composed another such piece for the Empire, A Normandy Wedding (an adaptation of the French Papa Gougon), which received an enthusiastic reception in New York at the Herald Square Theatre.

By 1900, Furst also had fairly steady work as a composer/arranger of incidental music to accompany theatrical productions.  He produced music for, or was music director for numerous plays, including a steady stream of dramas produced by David Belasco and Charles Frohman.  Two plays by Belasco which had Furst's musical accompaniments, Madame Butterfly and The Girl of the Golden West, were made into operas by Giacomo Puccini who attended their New York productions.  Musicologist Allan W. Atlas has shown that Puccini modeled some music heard in his opera La fanciulla del West on Furst's music.  His last theatrical composition was music for Joan the Woman, starring Geraldine Farrar.

Death 

Furst died in 1917 at his home in Freeport, Long Island, New York at the age of 66.  An enthusiastic gardener, Furst tripped in his garden, injuring his foot, which led to a brain clot.  He was survived by his widow Charlotte and his daughter, Mrs. Lillian Martin.

Works

Musicals and operettas 
This list may not be complete.

1880 My Geraldine
1892 The Isle of Champagne
1893 Princess Nicotine
1894 The Little Trooper

1895 Fleur-De-Lis
1897 The Little Minister
1898 A Normandy Wedding
1909 The White Sister

Plays with music by Furst 

This list may not be complete.

1888 She
1891 Miss Helyett
1895 The Heart of Maryland
1898 Christian
1899 Sherlock Holmes
1899 Barbara Frietchie
1900 A Royal Family
1900 Adventures of François
1900 Richard Carvel
1900 Lost River
1900 Madame Butterfly
1901 Brother Officers
1901 Colorado
1901 Du Barry
1901 Quality Street

1902 Iris
1902 The Darling of the Gods
1904 The Music Master
1905 Adrea
1905 The Girl of the Golden West
1906 Pippa Passes
1906 The Rose of the Rancho
1907 The Christian Pilgrim
1908 The World and His Wife
1908 The Winterfeast
1911 The Return of Peter Grimm
1913 Evangeline

Furst as conductor 
Furst served as conductor/music director of many of the works that he composed.  In addition, he is known to have conducted the following musicals and operettas:
1883 Green-Room Fun!
1893 An Artist's Model
1900 The Rose of Persia

Film music 
1916 The Green Swamp
1916 Let Katie Do It
1917 Joan the Woman

Legacy 
Much of the music composed by William Furst remains unpublished. Since he wrote "for hire," many of his works remained with David Belasco.  They now form a part of the David Belasco Collection of Incidental Music and Musicals in the Music Division of The New York Public Library for the Performing Arts.  His work for Madame Butterfly and The Girl of the Golden West have been cataloged separately.

Notes

External links 
Furst sheet music to "Home Sweet Home"
Furst sheet music - Babbie Waltzes from The Little Minister
"Intermezzo Gavin" from The Little Minister (1897)

1852 births
1917 deaths
American musical theatre composers
American male composers
19th-century American composers
19th-century American male musicians
20th-century American composers
20th-century American male musicians
Musicians from Baltimore
Accidental deaths in New York (state)
Accidental deaths from falls